Rusk is the name of some places in the U.S. state of Wisconsin:
Rusk, Burnett County, Wisconsin, a town
Rusk, Dunn County, Wisconsin, an unincorporated community
Rusk, Rusk County, Wisconsin, a town